Eugen Piunovschi (born 23 September 1946) is a Russian-born Moldovan former footballer and former manager of the Moldova national team.

Coaching career
After the end of his career as a footballer, he started working as a coach.

From 1992 to June 1993 he coached Tighina Bender's team.

Also, from 18 to 28 August 1992, he led the national team of Moldova. He was the head coach of the national team of Moldova, the team participated in the Jordanian tournament and took the third place.

In the 1993/94 season, he worked as the head coach of Bugeac Comrat. Then he worked for over 15 years at the Sports School in the city of Bronnitsy near Moscow

Honours

Player
FC Kairat
European Railways Cup: 1971

Manager
Moldova national team
Jordan Tournament: Third place 1992.

References

External links

 Profil na football.lg.ua
 Profil na fc-shahter-karaganda
 Profil na Eu-football

1946 births
Living people
Soviet footballers
Moldovan football managers
Moldova national football team managers
FC Zimbru Chișinău players
FC Zhenis Astana players
FC Shakhter Karagandy players
FC Kairat players
Russian football managers
Russian expatriate football managers
Association football forwards
Sportspeople from Irkutsk